The PFL 3 mixed martial arts event for the 2019 season of the Professional Fighters League was held on June 6, 2019, at the Nassau Coliseum in Uniondale, New York. This was the third regular season event of 2019 and included fights in the light heavyweight and heavyweight divisions.

Background
Ronny Markes weighed in at 211.8 pounds, 5.8 pounds over the Light Heavyweight limit of 206 pounds. The bout was held as scheduled. However, Markes was ineligible for points if he were to win the match while his opponent Sigi Pesaleli has been awarded 3 points regardless of the outcome of the match.

Results

Standings After Event
The point system consists of outcome based scoring and bonuses for an early win. Under the outcome based scoring system, the winner of a fight receives 3 points and the loser receives 0 points. If the fight ends in a draw, both fighters will receive 1 point. The bonus for winning a fight in the first, second, or third round is 3 points, 2 points, and 1 point respectively. For example, if a fighter wins a fight in the first round, then the fighter will receive 6 total points. If a fighter misses weight, then the fighter that missed weight will receive 0 points and his opponent will receive 3 points due to a walkover victory.

Light Heavyweight

Heavyweight

See also
List of PFL events
List of current PFL fighters

References

Professional Fighters League
2019 in mixed martial arts
Mixed martial arts in New York (state)
Sports in Long Island
2019 in sports in New York (state)
June 2019 sports events in the United States
Events on Long Island
Events in Uniondale, New York